Edoardo Weiss (1889-1970) was the earliest Italian psychoanalyst, and the founder of psychoanalysis in Italy. His most important theoretical contributions were perhaps to the development of ego state theory.

Weiss's first article, on the psychodynamics of asthma attacks, was published in 1922, and was followed over the next two decades by seven more, on subjects ranging from acting out to the fear of blushing. In 1950 he published his general survey, Principles of Psychoanalysis; in 1964 he published Agoraphobia in the light of ego psychology; and in 1970 he published the semi-autobiographic Sigmund Freud as a Consultant.

Weiss introduced the concept of destrudo into psychoanalysis, as well as that of psychic presence: the mental awareness of the internalised image of another ego, often parental, in oneself.  From this and other studies in ego states stemmed his major influence on such later figures as Eric Berne and John G. Watkins.

Life 
Weiss's interest in psychoanalysis led to him visiting the Vienna Psychoanalytic Society in 1908; he would subsequently be analysed by a leading member of that group, Paul Federn, with whom he established a lifelong collaboration. Working as an analyst in Trieste, Weiss analysed such literary figures as Umberto Saba; in the thirties he even consulted Freud about the propriety of himself providing a training analysis for his own son, and he regularly referred difficult cases to Freud for consultation.

After the Anschluss of 1938, Weiss emigrated to America, to work first at the Menninger Clinic,  and then with Franz Alexander in Chicago. He oversaw the publication of Federn's posthumous writings in 1953.

See also

References

Further reading
Paul Roazen, Edoardo Weiss: The House That Freud Built

External links 
 
 Weiss

20th-century American psychologists
1880s births
1970 deaths
Ego psychology
Austrian emigrants to the United States